The 1986 Ealing Council election took place on 8 May 1986 to elect members of Ealing London Borough Council in London, England. The whole council was up for election and the Labour party gained overall control of the council.

Background

Election result

Ward results

 2 from 94

References

1986
1986 London Borough council elections